Safet Džinović (11 March 1921 – 18 December 1997) was a Yugoslav Partisan, economist and the first president of the assembly of Bosnian football club FK Sarajevo.

References

1921 births
1997 deaths
People from Sarajevo
FK Sarajevo presidents of the assembly
Bosniaks of Bosnia and Herzegovina
University of Sarajevo alumni
Bosnia and Herzegovina economists